Mark Simmons is an American politician who was a member of the Oregon House of Representatives from 1997–2002 and served as the 62nd Speaker of the Oregon House of Representatives.

Early years
Simmons graduated from Elgin High School in 1975 and went straight to work for Boise Cascade. Before his election to the legislature, Simmons served as a board member of the Oregon Land Coalition.

Political career
Simmons was first elected to the State House in 1996.  He served as Majority Whip and Chairman of the Rules, Elections, and Public Affairs Committee.

In 2001, he was elected as the 62nd Speaker of the House, a position he held until 2003.

Later life
In 2002, while still Speaker of the House, Simmons was hired  as director of public affairs for the Oregon Association of Nurserymen. In 2005, Simmons was appointed as the Oregon State Director for USDA Rural Development.

References

Speakers of the Oregon House of Representatives
Republican Party members of the Oregon House of Representatives
Living people
Year of birth missing (living people)